Most of the food items which define modern North Indian and Subcontinental cooking have origins inside the Indian subcontinent though many foods that are now a part of them are based on fruits and vegetables that originated outside the Indian subcontinent.

Vegetable origins

Fruit origins

See also

 Indian cuisine
 North Indian cuisine

References

Further reading
 "Domestication of plants in the Old World," Daniel Zohary and Maria Hopf, Oxford University Press, 2000.
 "History of Food," Maguelonne Toussaint-Samat, Blackwell Publishing, 1994.
 "Culture and Cuisine: A Journey Through the History of Food," Jean François Revel, Doubleday, 1982.
 "The Agrarian History of England and Wales," Edward John T. Collins, Stuart Piggott, Joan Thirsk, Cambridge University Press, 1981.

History of Indian cuisine
History of Pakistani cuisine